Stuart Gray may refer to:

Stuart Gray (basketball) (born 1963), basketball player
Stuart Gray (footballer, born 1960), former footballer for Barnsley and Aston Villa, and football manager
Stuart Gray (footballer, born 1973), former footballer for Reading and Celtic
Stuart Gray (musician), Australian musician and composer

See also
Stewart Gray (1862–1937), Scottish advocate
Stewart Gray (footballer) (born 1950), English footballer